Prince Witold Adam Czartoryski (6 June 1824 – 14 November 1865) was a Polish nobleman (szlachcic), Duke of Klewán and Zuków.
Witold married Maria Grocholska on October 30, 1851 in Paris.

1824 births
1865 deaths
Witold
People from Puławy
Polish patrons of the arts